Sardar Faisal Amin Khan Gandapur is a Pakistani politician who was a member of the Provincial Assembly of Khyber Pakhtunkhwa from October 2018 to January 2023. He served as the Provincial Minister of for Local Government, Elections, and Rural Development from November 2021. He is son of Major Retd. Aminullah Khan Gandapur, the former Minister for Revenue, Excise and Taxation. He is elder brother of Ali Amin Gandapur, the former Federal Minister for Gilgit-Balitistan and Kashmir Affairs and younger brother of Umar Amin Khan Gandapur, the former Tehsil Nazim Dera Ismail Khan.

Political career
Gandapur was elected to the Provincial Assembly of Khyber Pakhtunkhwa  as a candidate of Pakistan Tehreek-e-Insaf (PTI) from the constituency PK-97 in 2018 Pakistani by-elections held on 14 October 2018. He defeated Farhan Afzal Malik of Pakistan Peoples Party (PPP). Gandapur garnered 18,170 votes while his closest rival, the combined opposition candidate Farhan Dhap Advocate of PPP secured only 7,609 votes. He is presently  Minister for Local Bodies, Elections and Rural Development in KPK Cabinet.

References

Living people
Pakistan Tehreek-e-Insaf politicians
Politicians from Khyber Pakhtunkhwa
Year of birth missing (living people)